Fann, or FANN, may refer to:
Fast Artificial Neural Network
Fann Wong